Vishal–Shekhar are an Indian music composition, production, singing, and songwriting duo consisting of Vishal Dadlani and Shekhar Ravjiani from Mumbai. Known predominantly for their work as music composers in Hindi cinema, Vishal–Shekhar have also recorded in Telugu and Marathi with the likes of Akon, The Vamps, Imogen Heap, Diplo. They have been streamed over 3 billion times on YouTube, have had 72 number-one singles, and have been featured on over 350 film sound tracks. They are one of the most successful music composers in the history of Bollywood music. 

Their most popular soundtracks include Jhankaar Beats (2003), Dus (2005), Bluffmaster (2005), Salaam Namaste (2005), Left Right Left (2006), Om Shanti Om (2007), Tashan (2008), Bachna Ae Haseeno (2008), Dostana (2008), I Hate Luv Storys (2010), Anjaana Anjaani (2010), Tees Maar Khan (2010), Ra.One (2011), Student of the Year (2012), Chennai Express (2013), Hasee Toh Phasee (2014), Bang Bang! (2014), Happy New Year (2014), Sultan (2016), Befikre (2016), Tiger Zinda Hai (2017), Student of the Year 2 (2019), Bharat (2019), War (2019), Baaghi 3 (2020), &  Pathaan (2023). They have also appeared as judges on Indian Idol Junior, the stage India, MTV hustle, Sa Re Ga Ma Pa, Voice of India – Mummy Ke Superstars, Indian Idol, Jo Jeeta Wohi Superstar.

Background
Vishal Dadlani is also the vocalist of Mumbai-based electronic band Pentagram. He collaborated with Imogen Heap on the song "Minds Without Fear" for an episode of The Dewarists.

Shekhar Ravjiani is a trained classical singer (under Ustad Niaz Ahmed Khan). He learned to play the accordion from his father, a music enthusiast, Hasmukh Ravjiani. Shekhar was a participant of Zee TV singing contest Sa Re Ga Ma Pa in 1997. He composed and sung Marathi songs "Saazni" in 2012 and "Saavli" (with Sunidhi Chauhan) in 2013.

Musical film career

1999–2002: Beginnings in Bollywood
Vishal Dadlani, along with his Pentagram teammates Shiraz Bhattacharya and Samrat, made his Bollywood debut by composing tracks for Tyger Productions' film Pyaar Mein Kabhi Kabhi (1999) including the hit songs "Woh Pehli Baar" and "Musu Musu Hasi". Coincidentally, Dadlani's childhood friend Shekhar Ravjiani also composed a few tracks on the same film including "Dil Se Mere Door Na Jana". The two childhood friends met in the studio while recording songs for the film where they decided to form a team together to write music for Bollywood films. They formed the musical duo Vishal-Shekhar.

Their first composition in Bollywood as a duo was as guest composers for Padam Kumar's Champion, where they composed two tracks "Aisa Champion Kahan" and "Lelo Lelo". They would compose one song each as guest composers for Rehnaa Hai Terre Dil Mein (2001) and Mujhe Kucch Kehna Hai (2001). Vishal-Shekhar's first full soundtrack was Vadh (2002).

2003–2007: Breakthrough
Vishal-Shekhar first got noticed in Bollywood with Jhankaar Beats (2003), which included hit songs such as "Tu Aashiqui Hai" and "Suno Na". They won the Filmfare RD Burman Award for New Music Talent for Jhankaar Beats. Recognized for introducing techno music in Bollywood, Vishal-Shekhar continued further success after Jhankaar Beats with soundtracks like Supari (2003) and Musafir (2004). "Allah Ke Bande" from Waisa Bhi Hota Hai Part II also became a success during this period. Vishal-Shekhar began receiving offers from bigger banners and 2005 was hugely successful for the duo as they composed the songs for three films: Salaam Namaste, Dus and Bluffmaster. Dus earned them their first nomination for the Filmfare Award for Best Music Director.

The duo would continue to write music for successful soundtracks during this period including Golmaal: Fun Unlimited (2006), I See You (2006), Ta Ra Rum Pum (2007) and Om Shanti Om (2007). Om Shanti Om  which had the hit songs "Main Agar Kahoon", "Dard-e-Disco" and "Aankhon Mein Teri" earned the duo their second nomination for the Filmfare Award for Best Music Director. They won the Best Composer Award at the 2nd Asian Film Awards for Om Shanti Om.

2008–present: Mainstream success
2008 was the year when Vishal-Shekhar established themselves among the leading music directors in Bollywood with extremely popular soundtracks for Tashan, De Taali, Bachna Ae Haseeno and Dostana. Tashan had the hit song "Falak Tak Chal Saath Mere" while Bachna Ae Haseeno had several hit tracks including "Khuda Jaane" and "Lucky Boy" and Dostana had the evergreen item number "Desi Girl". Dostana earned them their third nomination for the Filmfare Award for Best Music Director.

After only one release with Aladin in 2009, Vishal-Shekhar continued their success in 2010. The year included Anjaana Anjaani which had the hit songs "Tujhe Bhula Diya" and "Aas Paas Khuda" and I Hate Luv Storys which had evergreen successes with "Bin Tere" and "Bahara". Both these films earned them two nominations for the Filmfare Award for Best Music Director at the 56th Filmfare Awards. The same year also included Tees Maar Khan, which included the hit item number "Sheila Ki Jawani", one of the two most popular Bollywood songs of 2010 along with "Munni Badnaam Hui".

Vishal-Shekhar's success continued with two major soundtracks in 2011 for Ra.One and The Dirty Picture. Ra.One included the hit songs "Dildaara" and "Chammak Challo", which featured internationally renowned singer Akon on vocals while The Dirty Picture had the hit item number "Ooh La La" and "Ishq Sufiana". They were nominated for the Filmfare Award for Best Music Director for Ra.One. The following year, Vishal-Shekhar composed music for Karan Johar's Student of the Year (2012), which included hit tracks such as "Ishq Wala Love" and "The Disco Song", earning the duo their seventh nomination for the Filmfare Award for Best Music Director.

Vishal-Shekhar continued their association with Red Chillies Entertainment after Om Shanti Om with successful soundtracks for Chennai Express (2013) and Happy New Year (2014). They continued their success in 2016 with Sultan and Befikre. Sultan had the hit song "Baby Ko Bass Pasand Hai" and "Jag Ghoomeya" while Befikre had the huge hit song "Nashe Si Chad Gayi" which went viral and was the first Indian song to clock 300 million views and then 400  million views on YouTube. It currently has over 600 million views. During the same year, the duo collaborated with British rock band The Vamps for the single "Beliya".

Vishal–Shekhar's music for Tiger Zinda Hai (2017) was a huge success with "Dil Diyan Gallan" and "Swag Se Swagat", with the latter song becoming the fastest song in the world to hit 100 million views and clocked up to 650  million views on YouTube in its first year.

Vishal-Shekhar have emerged as Bollywood's biggest music directors by continuing to compose successful soundtracks for Student of the Year 2 (2019), Bharat (2019) and Pathaan (2023).

Other work
They have been judges on the star hunt show Sa Re Ga Ma Pa Challenge 2007 and the musical talent show Jo Jeeta Wohi Super Star with director and choreographer Farah Khan. They are the judges on Voice of India – Mummy Ke Superstars. They were mentors and judges in the reality show Sa Re Ga Ma Pa Singing Superstar with Daler Mehndi and Sajid–Wajid.

They composed the Indian Premier League theme song of season 3 and the anthem of Kolkata Knight Riders.

Following the 2008 Mumbai attacks, Vishal Dadlani launched a petition to ban live media coverage during the rescue operations.

They performed twice at Delhi Technological University −2014 and 2018.

On 23 January 2012, Vishal and Shekhar performed at Spring Fest 2012 in IIT Kharagpur on 22 January 2012; they also performed at Saarang in IIT Madras. and in February 2012, at Crossroads 2012 in SRCC. On 25 March 2012, Vishal and Shekhar with Shruti Pathak performed live at Pandit Deendayal Petroleum University in Flare.

Vishal–Shekhar composed the IPL 6 anthem "Jumping Japaang" and the IPL 7 anthem "Chalo Bulawa Aya Hai".

Vishal Dadlani appeared in cameo roles in Om Shanti Om, Tees Maar Khan and Happy New Year.

Vishal was one of the first Indian celebrities to openly support the Aam Aadmi Party.

On 28 September 2014, Vishal and Shekhar performed live at Festember at NIT Trichy.

In 2018, Vishal–Shekhar performed at Altice Arena, Lisbon along with Algerian Singer Khaled.

Both Vishal and Shekhar appeared as judges in the reality singing show for children and teens, Indian Idol Junior, Season One, while only Vishal appeared in Season Two.

Awards and nominations

Annual Central European Bollywood Awards

Apsara Film and Television Producers Guild Award

Asian Film Awards

BIG Star Entertainment Awards

Filmfare Awards

Global Indian Music Academy Awards

International Indian Film Academy Awards

Mirchi Music Awards

References

Indian male singer-songwriters
Indian singer-songwriters
Sa Re Ga Ma Pa participants
Bollywood playback singers
Indian musical duos
Pop-folk music groups
Indian record producers